"Scientist" is a song recorded by South Korean girl group Twice. It was released on November 12, 2021, by JYP Entertainment and Republic Records as the title track of the group's third Korean and overall sixth studio album  Formula of Love: O+T<3.

Background 

On October 1, 2021, Twice released their first English single, "The Feels". At the end of the song's music video, an upcoming full-length album and tour were teased. On October 24, JYP Entertainment released a trailer featuring Twice members dressed up as scientists at the "Twice Love Lab", a laboratory where they conduct "love experiments". On November 5, a snippet of the song was uploaded to Twice's TikTok account.

Composition 
"Scientist" has its lyrics written by Sim Eun-jee and music composed by Anne-Marie, Melanie Fontana, Michel "Lindgren" Schulz, Tommy Brown, Steven Franks, and 72. The song has been described as a blend of deep house and dance-pop with 80s synth beats. Lyrically, it expresses that "love is not something you can calculate, study and try to find an answer to but is something you should follow with your heart." Running for more than 3 minutes, the song is composed in the key of F♯ mixolydian and has a tempo of 113 beats per minute.

Critical reception 
Bailey Kanthatham of the New University acknowledged the song's "innocent approach to love", contrasting it with Twice's most recent singles, "Alcohol-Free", "Perfect World", and "The Feels".

Year-end lists

Promotion 
JYP Entertainment released several concept photos and video teasers to promote Formula of Love: O+T=<3 and "Scientist".

Live performances 
Twice performed "Scientist" on several music shows in South Korea, including KBS2's Music Bank, MBC's Show! Music Core, and SBS's Inkigayo. In the United States, the group appeared on the MTV news show Fresh Out Live on November 13 with a performance of "Scientist".

Music video 
"Scientist" was released on November 12 with an accompanying music video. Directed and produced by Rima Yoon and Dongju Jang of Rigend Film – who previously worked with Twice on Formula of Love: O+T=<3s album trailer and "Alcohol-Free"'s music video – the music video is primarily set in a laboratory where the members of Twice are depicted as scientists researching about love. Its dance was choreographed by La Chica, a dance trio who have worked with Aespa, BoA, Chungha, and CLC.

Japanese version 
The Japanese version of "Scientist" was released as a digital single on March 2, 2022. The Japanese lyrics were written by Yuki Kokubo.

Accolades

Credits and personnel 
Credits adapted from Twice's official website.

Recording 
 Recorded at JYPE Studios (Seoul, South Korea)
 Mixed at JYPE Studios (Seoul, South Korea)
 Mastered at 821 Sound Mastering (South Korea)

Personnel 
 Twice – vocals
 72 – composer
 Anne-Marie – composer
 Kwon Nam-woo – masterer
 Lee Tae-seop – mixer
 Melanie Fontana – composer, background vocals
 Michel "Lindgren" Schulz – composer, producer
 Tommy Brown – composer, producer
 Sim Eun-jee – lyricist, vocal director
 Sophia Pae – background vocals
 Steven Franks – composer, producer

Charts

Weekly charts

Monthly charts

See also 
 List of Inkigayo Chart winners (2021)
 List of Music Bank Chart winners (2021)

References 

2021 singles
2021 songs
Twice (group) songs